Princess Sissi (also known as Saban's Sissi the Princess) is a children's animated series. It debuted on October 27, 1997 on France 3 and within the same time in Italy on Rai 1, and later premiered in Canada on Radio-Canada on September 5, 1998. A co-production between Saban International Paris, Animation Ciné-Groupe J.P. Inc., ARD Degeto, France 3 and RAI Radiotelevisione Italiana, the series is based on the life of the Austrian Empress Elisabeth, nicknamed "Sissi".

The series aired internationally on Fox Kids and Jetix, in Latin America, and Europe. It did also air on Disney Channel in Israel, in early 2010.

Story
A unique Bavarian girl, Sissi's, life changes forever after the day she meets the charming and noble princes, Franz and Karl. It doesn't take long until Sissi and Franz fall in love and start to make plans for a future together, but there are so many people trying to make sure that the magnificent wedding day is delayed and postponed several times. Sissi and Franz must face jealousy, deceit, treason, and danger between the fronts of Austria and Hungary.

Episodes

Season 1

Season 2

Home Media
In France between 1997-1999, PolyGram Video (and later Universal Pictures Video) released five VHS volumes of the series, containing three episodes each.

In the United Kingdom - Two volumes containing two episodes each, titled "Sissi in Possenhofen" and "Imperial Guests" were released on January 14, 2000 by 20th Century Fox Home Entertainment.

See also
Sissi: La Giovane Imperatrice and Italian-animated adaptation produced in 2017 by Mondo TV which did 2 seasons (56 episodes) in 2D and is scheduled to release a 3rd season (52 episodes) in 3D.

References

External links

1990s Canadian animated television series
1990s French animated television series
Canadian children's animated adventure television series
French children's animated adventure television series
Fox Kids
Monarchy in fiction
Jetix original programming
Cultural depictions of Empress Elisabeth of Austria
Cultural depictions of Franz Joseph I of Austria
Television shows set in Austria
Television series set in the 19th century
Television series by Saban Entertainment
Animation based on real people
Television series about princesses
France Télévisions children's television series
RAI original programming
Historical television series